Gunning or Gunnin can refer to:

Places
 Gunning, New South Wales, Australia, a town on the Old Hume Highway

People with the surname Gunning
 Anne Gunning (1929–1990), Irish fashion model
 Ashleigh Gunning (born 1985), American soccer player
 Brian Gunning, Australian biologist
 Carmel Gunning, traditional Irish musician
 Charles Gunning (disambiguation), several people
 Christopher Gunning (born 1944), British composer
 Dave Gunning, Canadian folk singer-songwriter
 Elizabeth Gunning (disambiguation), several people
 Gavin Gunning (born 1991), Irish footballer
 Sir George Gunning, 2nd Baronet (1763–1823), English politician
 Harry Gunning (1916–2002), Canadian scientist and administrator
 Henry Gunning (disambiguation), several people
 Hy Gunning (1888–1975), American baseball baseman
 J. W. B. Gunning (Jan Willem Boudewijn Gunning, 1860–1913), South African zoologist, grandfather of Christopher Gunning
 Jessica Gunning, British actress
 Jimmy Gunning (1929–1993), Scottish footballer
 John Gunning (disambiguation), several people
 John W. Gunning (1847–1910), American politician and businessman
 Ken Gunning (1914–1991), American basketball player and college coach
 Lisa Gunning, English film editor, director and writer
 Lucy Gunning (born 1964), English filmmaker, installation artist, sculptor, video artist and lecturer
 Maria Gunning, later Maria Coventry, Countess of Coventry (1733–1760), English noblewoman
 Louise Gunning (1879–1960), American soprano singer
 Megan Gunning (born 1992), Canadian freestyle skier
 Michael Gunning (born 1994), Jamaican swimmer
 Oliver Gunning (born 1996), Irish cricketer
 Peter Gunning (1614–1684), English royalist church leader
 Piet Gunning (1913–1967), Dutch field hockey player
 Quirijn Gunning (born 1991), Dutch international cricketer
 Rich Gunning (born 1966), American voice actor
 Robert Gunning (disambiguation), several people
 Rosemary R. Gunning (1905–1997), New York assemblywoman
 Sarah Ogan Gunning (1910–1983), American singer and songwriter
 Susannah Gunning (c.1740–1800), British novelist
 Thomas P. Gunning (1882–1943), American dentist and politician
 Tom Gunning (1862–1931), American baseball catcher
 William Gunning (1796–1860), Archdeacon of Bath (from 1852)
 William Gunning (Gaelic footballer) (1864–1895), Irish Gaelic footballer

Baronetcy
 Gunning baronets

People with the given name Gunning
 Gunning Bedford Sr. (1742-1797), American lawyer and Governor of Delaware
 Gunning Bedford Jr. (1747-1812), American lawyer and Continental Congressman
 Gunning S. Bedford (1806-1870), US physician

Other uses
 Gunning fog index, measure of readability
 Gunning transceiver logic, low voltage electronic signalling

See also
 "Gunnin'", a song by Hedley from the 2005 album Hedley
 Gun (disambiguation)
 Gunner (disambiguation)